Direct Descent (1980) is a short science fiction novel by American writer Frank Herbert.  It was based on the short story "Pack Rat Planet" published in 1954 in Astounding Science Fiction.

Plot summary
Set in the far future, it consists of two stories about how the peaceful Archivists of the library planet Earth have to deal with warmongers arriving and trying to exploit knowledge for power. It contains a lot of pictures and is aimed at children or adolescents.

1980 American novels
Novels by Frank Herbert
American science fiction novels
Ace Books books